Frank Fuller Saunders (1902-1978) was an Australian rugby league player who played in the 1920s.

Background
Saunders was born in Rockdale, New South Wales on 11 November 1902.

Playing career
Frank 'Fatty' Saunders played with St. George during the clubs' foundation years. He played seven seasons with Saints between 1923-1929 including St. George's first grand final in 1927. Saunders also represented N.S.W. on two occasions in 1924-1925.

Post playing
After his retirement from football, he was a committeeman and loyal servant of the St. George club for most of his life.

Death
Saunders died from cancer on 19 July 1978.

References

St. George Dragons players
Australian rugby league players
New South Wales rugby league team players
1902 births
1978 deaths
Rugby league wingers
Rugby league centres
Rugby league players from Sydney